Barmoya is a rural locality in the Livingstone Shire, Queensland, Australia. In the  Barmoya had a population of 80 people.

History 
Barmoya Settlement State School opened on 31 August 1911. in 1935 was renamed Barmoya East State School. It closed on 4 July 1969.

Barmoya Central State School opened on 28 August 1918. In 1936 it was renamed Wattlebank State School. It closed in December 1959.

The locality was officially named and bounded on 18 February 2000.

In the  Barmoya had a population of 80 people.

References 

Shire of Livingstone
Localities in Queensland